Sha Tin Government Secondary School (STGSS; 沙田官立中學) is located in Sha Tin, Hong Kong. It was founded in September 1972 and has now become a full-fledged co-educational grammar school. There are 24 classes with an enrollment of approximately 960 students in the year 2017–18. The current principal is Ms. Lam Yuet-wah Janice (林月華).

School information

Achievements
STGSS counts 6 winners (PANG Wai Sum Diana 1990, LUK Man Chung 1993, YEUNG Chok Hang 1996, CHAN Ting Ting 2006, LEUNG Ka Wing Connie 2007, LUK Man Ping Maggie 2010) of the prestigious Hong Kong Outstanding Students Awards, ranking 12th (tied with Diocesan Boys' School, St. Paul's Co-educational College and Marymount Secondary School) among all secondary schools in Hong Kong. In 2012, 4 senior students, Yiu Shing Fung (5C), Tai Tsz Long (6B), Tai Tsz Fung (6B) and Chen Kwan Kin (6C), were being awarded the Champion in the 45th Joint School Science Exhibition Proposal Competition and Overall Champion in the 45th Joint School Science Exhibition ITC Innovation Award with the theme of "Disaster Counteraction Scientific Innovation".

School organisation
The school is a co-educational secondary school founded by the Hong Kong Government. School policies are basically devised in accordance with the educational ordinances and policies of the Education Bureau. The School Management Committee (SMC) is the top decision-making body. Its chairperson is an official appointed by the Education Bureau. The SMC also includes the school principal, two teacher representatives, two parent representatives, two alumni representatives and two community members. The present chairperson of the SMC is Mr. NG Ka-shing, Principal Education Officer (Curriculum Development) of the Education Bureau. The community members are Professor POON Wai-yin, Isabella and Mrs TONG AU Yin-man. The SMC is responsible for setting the direction of school development and managing the school budgets. The principal, with the help of two assistant principals, is responsible for the daily operation of the school.

Facilities
There are 30 classrooms, 40 science laboratories, 50 computer rooms, 10 Multimedia Learning Centres and a number of special rooms such as the Student Activity Room, Astronomy Room, English Room, Art Room, Geography Room, Dinosaur Room, Feathered Dinosaur Room and Music Room. All classrooms are air-conditioned and most are equipped with audio-visual facilities. The playground is accessible to all students for sports and leisure in a restricted time. Other facilities include the newly renovated air-conditioned School Hall, Library, Wackoes' Room, Conference room, Teachers' Resources Center, Christopher's Room, Prefects' Room, Thomas's Room, Broadcasting Room, Madmen's Room, Social Worker's Room and Student Council Room.

The English room
The English Room is a meeting place specially designated for the English Debating Club and the English Association of the school. National/Regional flags of several places are hung up on the wall of the English Room, including Hong Kong, Australia, New Zealand, Russia, Canada, China and the United Kingdom.

Language policy
The school has been using English as the medium of instruction (EMI) in all subjects except Chinese, Chinese Literature, Chinese History, Liberal Studies and Putonghua. To help students to become biliterate in English and Chinese, and trilingual in English, Mandarin and Cantonese, and to encourage students to learn English and Mandarin their daily life, the school organizes an English Speaking Day every Western Festival and a Super Dinosaur Day per annum.

Information technology in education
Access to the Internet and Intranet is available in every classroom and special room. The school incorporates digital movie production in the computer curriculum in the junior levels.

Alumni association (STGSSAA)
The Sha Tin Government Secondary School Alumni Association (沙田官立中學校友會) was established in 1995 as a non-profit organization. It aims at promoting liaison between alumni, acting as a bridge between alumni and Sha Tin Government Secondary School and organizing activities for alumni.

References

External links

Official Website of Shatin Government Secondary School
Official Website of STGSSAA

Government schools in Hong Kong
Educational institutions established in 1972
Secondary schools in Hong Kong
Sha Tin
Tai Wai